Mandria is the name of the following settlements :

Mandria, Limassol, a village in Cyprus
Mandria, Paphos, a village in Cyprus